Polypodium hesperium is a species of fern known by the common name western polypody. It is native to western North America from British Columbia to California, and the Rocky Mountains to northern Mexico, where it grows in rocky habitat types.

This is an allopolyploid species of hybrid origin, its parent species being Polypodium glycyrrhiza and Polypodium amorphum.

Description
This polypody anchors with a thin, scaly rhizome. Each leaf is made up of many dull-pointed linear or lance-shaped segments which may be thin and membranous or firm and leathery in texture, and smooth or serrated on the edges. The underside of each leaf segment has a few brownish, reddish, or nearly black sori, which contain the spores.

External links

Jepson Manual Treatment: Polypodium hesperium
Washington Burke Museum

hesperium
Ferns of California
Ferns of Mexico
Ferns of the United States
Flora of Northwestern Mexico
Flora of the Northwestern United States
Flora of the Southwestern United States
Flora of the Klamath Mountains
Flora of the Rocky Mountains
Flora of the Sierra Nevada (United States)
Natural history of the California Coast Ranges
Natural history of the Transverse Ranges
Ferns of the Americas
Plants described in 1900
Flora without expected TNC conservation status